The National Bureau of Air Accidents Investigation of Ukraine (NBAAI) is the national civil aviation incident investigation authority of Ukraine, a "specialist expert organization" consisting of 40 experts and subordinated to the Cabinet of Ministers of Ukraine.

The bureau was established on March 21, 2012, by the special Cabinet Decree #228 according to the provisions of the Aerial Code of Ukraine.

As of April 2012, Oleg Babenko was the Bureau Director

Bureau is headquartered in Kyiv at #14 Peremohy Ave. (highrise building of the Ministry of Infrastructure).

History
The NBAAI had requested that the Dutch Safety Board (DSB) participate in the international investigation of Malaysia Airlines Flight 17; the DSB received formal notice of the accident from the NBAAI on 18 July 2014. The NBAAI delegated the investigation to the DSB because of the large number of Dutch passengers and the fact that the flight originated in Amsterdam.

See also

 State Aviation Administration of Ukraine

References

External links
 National Bureau for Civilian Aircraft Events and Accidents Investigation
 National Bureau for Civilian Aircraft Events and Accidents Investigation 
 Розслідуванням авіаційних подій та інцидентів з цивільними літаками займатиметься незалежна експертна установа (Archive) news on the Government Portal 
 Катастрофу в Донецке расследует Нацбюро расследований авиапроисшествий (Archive) 


Aviation organizations based in Ukraine
Independent agencies of the Ukrainian government
Organizations investigating aviation accidents and incidents